Fernando Nicolas Oliva (born September 26, 1971) is a former Argentine football player.

Club statistics

Honors 
Shimizu S-Pulse
 J.League Cup: 1996
 Asian Cup Winners Cup: 2000
 Emperor's Cup: 2001
 Japanese Super Cup: 2001

References

External links

1971 births
Living people
Argentine footballers
J1 League players
Shimizu S-Pulse players
Talleres de Córdoba footballers
Argentine expatriate footballers
Expatriate footballers in Japan
Association football forwards
Footballers from Córdoba, Argentina